Oplachantha is a genus of flies in the family Stratiomyidae.

Species
Oplachantha albitarsis (Macquart, 1846)
Oplachantha annulipes (Enderlein, 1921)
Oplachantha atricalx James, 1977
Oplachantha bellula (Williston, 1888)
Oplachantha caerulescens (Schiner, 1868)
Oplachantha cincticornis Enderlein, 1921
Oplachantha divisa James, 1977
Oplachantha formosa Enderlein, 1921
Oplachantha lanuginosa Enderlein, 1921
Oplachantha latifrons Enderlein, 1921
Oplachantha mexicana (Bellardi, 1859)
Oplachantha pallida James, 1977
Oplachantha peruana Enderlein, 1921
Oplachantha pulchella Williston, 1888
Oplachantha subcrassicalx Enderlein, 1921
Oplachantha tricolor (Wiedemann, 1828)
Oplachantha viriata Enderlein, 1921

References

Stratiomyidae
Brachycera genera
Taxa named by Camillo Rondani
Diptera of South America